The Living Land is a cross-genre tabletop role-playing supplement, written by Christopher Kubasik, with cover art by Daniel Horne and interior illustrations by Jeff Menges, and published by West End Games in 1990. The first sourcebook published for Torg, detailing the mist-filled jungle and its primitive dinosaur people that had invaded two areas of North America. It received mixed reviews in game periodicals including Games International, White Wolf, and Dragon. A rewritten version was published in 2018 by Ulisses Spiele for Torg Eternity.

Contents
In 1990, West End Games released Torg, a game in which aliens had overlaid a psychic landscape on various areas of the Earth, forcing reality to change to their whims. The Living Land, published the same year, was the first supplement, and describes the prehistoric realm that the alien overlord Baruk Kaah has laid over the reality of the east and west coasts of North America. The result is a world of dinosaurs versus humanity where some Americans have reverted to primitive savagery, and others have resisted. The setting reminded reviewer Paul Mason of Arthur Conan Doyle's The Lost World or Edgar Rice Burrough's Pellucidar.

The second half of the book explains rules for dealing with the lack of technology, and lists adventure ideas and new character templates.

Publication history
Originally published in 1990 by West End Games as a 128-page book, it was rewritten in 2018 by Ulisses Spiele for Torg Eternity, and developed into a series of products:
 UNA10020 - The Living Land (Sourcebook), 2018
 UNA10021 - The Living Land GM Screen and Archetypes, 2018
 UNA10022 - The God Box (A Living Land Campaign), 2018
 UNA10024 - Delphi Missions - Living Land (11 Living Land adventures), 2018
 UNA10025 - The Living Land Threat Blips & Cards (GM accessories), 2018
 UNA10026 - The Living Land Map Pack 1, 2018
 UNA10027 - The God Box Soundtrack (background music for The God Box), 2018
 UNA10028 - The Living Land Map Pack 2, 2018

Reception
In the July 1990 edition of Games International (Issue 16), Paul Mason called the tone of this supplement "too relentlessly pulpish to allow for subtle characterisation."

In the February 1991 edition of Dragon (Issue #166), Jim Bambra was ambivalent about this product, saying, "Although well written, the setting comes across as a limited one. After getting lost in the deep mist of the Living Land a few times and fighting rampaging lizardmen, its possibilities for adventure come across as fairly narrow."

Other reviews
White Wolf #22 (Aug./Sept., 1990)

References

Role-playing game supplements introduced in 1990
Science fiction role-playing game supplements
Torg supplements